Kim Pyong-sik (February 10, 1919 – July 21, 1999) was a North Korean politician who served as Vice President of North Korea and chairman of the Korean Social Democratic Party.

History
He was born in South Jeolla Province. Kim Pyong-sik worked for the Union of Korean Students in Japan and the North Korean Central News Agency. After the creation of the General Association of Koreans residing in Japan (Chongryon, pro-communist organization) in 1955, he held important positions within this organization. Later, he returned to North Korea and joined the Korean Social Democratic Party, a party that became pro-communist under Choi Yong-kun which closely related with the Workers' Party of Korea. Kim Pyong-sik was a member of the Presidium of the Central Committee of the Korean Social Democratic Party and later became its president. After his resignation as president, he continued to work as an adviser to the Central Committee of the Social Democratic Party and had influence over the party. From 1994 until 1998, he was vice-president of North Korea.

Kim Pyong-sik was also vice chairman of the Standing Committee of the Supreme People's Assembly, North Korea's unicameral parliament.

Kim died on July 21, 1999. He was given a state funeral with 18 persons on the funeral committee including Hong Song-nam. He was posthumously awarded the National Reunification Prize on August 5, 1999.

Works

References

Korean Social Democratic Party politicians
Members of the Supreme People's Assembly
Vice presidents of North Korea
1919 births
1999 deaths